KSQB may refer to:

 KZHC-FM, a radio station (92.7 FM) licensed to serve Burns, Oregon, United States, which held the call sign KSQB from 2017 to 2020
 KQSF, a radio station (95.7 FM) licensed to serve Dell Rapids, South Dakota, United States, which held the call sign KSWB-FM from 2001 to 2013
 KZOY, a radio station (1520 AM) licensed to serve Sioux Falls, South Dakota, which held the call sign KSQB from 2001 to 2010